Rowley's Hill is a hill in Cambridgeshire, near the villages of Harston and Newton. Although of only moderate height (50 m/164 ft), it has a relatively large prominence due to it being surrounded on all sides by a 'moat' of much lower land. It therefore stands separate from the other hills in the region and has a distinctive appearance.

The hill has a north east top, St Margaret's Mount, on top of which is an obelisk. It is a memorial to Gregory Wale, of Little Shelford, of the eighteenth century.

Hills of Cambridgeshire
Obelisks in England
Harston